is a Japanese footballer currently playing as a centre back for Kashiwa Reysol of J1 League.

Career statistics

Club
.

Notes

References

External links

2003 births
Living people
Association football people from Chiba Prefecture
Japanese footballers
Association football defenders
Kashiwa Reysol players